Marriage of the Virgin or the Ginori Altarpiece is a 1523 oil on panel painting by Rosso Fiorentino, signed and dated by the artist. It was commissioned by Carlo Ginori for the chapel dedicated to the Virgin Mary and saint Joseph - previously owned by the Masi family that chapel had been acquired by the Ginori family in 1520. It still hangs in the Basilica, whilst a drawn copy attributed to Antonio Circignani is now in the Louvre (n.1592).

Five figures kneel on the steps up to the main scene, with two putti and an old female saint (perhaps Saint Anne) to the left and a Dominican saint (possibly Vincent Ferrer and possibly a portrait of the painting's commissioner) and a young female saint with a book (Saint Apollonia).

References

Fiorentino
Fiorentino
Paintings in Florence
Fiorentino
Fiorentino
Fiorentino
Paintings by Rosso Fiorentino
1523 paintings